Wang Yang is a Chinese paralympic wheelchair racer. He participated at the 2020 Summer Paralympics in the athletics competition, being awarded the bronze medal in the men's 800 metres event on T34 class, scoring 1:45.68.

References 

Living people
Place of birth missing (living people)
Year of birth missing (living people)
Chinese male wheelchair racers
Athletes (track and field) at the 2020 Summer Paralympics
Medalists at the 2020 Summer Paralympics
Paralympic medalists in athletics (track and field)
Paralympic athletes of China
Paralympic bronze medalists for China